Isa ibn Nasturus ibn Surus was a Coptic Egyptian scribe who served as vizier of the Fatimid Caliphate in 993–996 under al-Aziz Billah. He was executed by Caliph al-Hakim in 1000.

References

Sources
 

1000 deaths
10th-century people from the Fatimid Caliphate
Egyptian Copts
Viziers of the Fatimid Caliphate
Year of birth unknown
People executed by the Fatimid Caliphate
Copts from the Fatimid Caliphate